Dharmaj is a village in Petlad taluka, Anand district, Gujarat, India. As of the 2011 Census of India, the population was 10,429. The village is nicknamed the "village of NRIs" (Non-resident Indians) due to the large number of families who have moved abroad. It is one of the richest and most developed villages in India. This small village consists of more than 8 bank branches plus its own village cooperative bank.

References

External links
 https://web.archive.org/web/20131101115738/http://mydharmaj.com/index.aspx
 http://www.shreejalaram.org/inde1.html
 https://web.archive.org/web/20141124050257/http://dharmajgampanchayat.org/

Villages in Anand district